HD 91496 (HR 4142) is a giant star in the constellation Carina, with an apparent magnitude is 4.92 and an MK spectral class of K4/5 III.  It has been suspected of varying in brightness, but this has not been confirmed.

It is a distant background star.

References

Carina (constellation)
K-type giants
Durchmusterung objects
091496
051495
Carinae, 204
4142